Alfredo alla Scrofa is an Italian restaurant in Rome, Italy. It has been operating since 1914 and is known as the birthplace of Fettuccine Alfredo.

History
Alfredo Di Lelio, founder of Alfredo alla Scrofa, claims to be the creator of Fettuccine Alfredo. According to family accounts, in 1892 Alfredo Di Lelio began to work in a restaurant that was located in piazza Rosa, run by his mother Angelina. In 1914, Di Lelio converted an oil and wine shop into a restaurant, initially called "Alfredo", on the Via della Scrofa in central Rome.

Di Lelio invented "fettuccine al triplo burro" (later named "fettuccine all'Alfredo" or "fettuccine Alfredo") in 1907 or 1908, while running his oil and wine shop, in an effort to entice his wife, Ines, to eat after giving birth to their first child Armando. Alfredo added extra butter or "triplo burro” to the fettuccine when mixing it together for his wife. In 1920, two famous American actors, Douglas Fairbanks and Mary Pickford, ate at Alfredo alla Scrofa while on their honeymoon. The couple ordered fettuccine al triplo burro, asked for the recipe, and brought it to the U.S.

In 1943, Di Lelio sold his restaurant to a new owner. In 1950, Alfredo Di Lelio decided to open another restaurant with his son Armando in Piazza Augusto Imperatore, Il Vero Alfredo 'the true Alfredo', that is still in business and managed by Di Lelio's grandchildren.

Both restaurants are known for their celebrity walls.

In 1977, Di Lelio and a partner opened another Alfredo's near Rockefeller Center in New York City. A third Alfredo's opened in Epcot at Disney World, but closed in 2007. These restaurants became popular and was distinguished for the "Alfredo sauce".

References

External links
 

Restaurants in Rome
Restaurants established in 1914
Italian companies established in 1914